The 1995 Philadelphia Eagles season was their 63rd in the National Football League (NFL). The team improved upon their previous output of 7–9, going 10–6 under new head coach Ray Rhodes and qualifying for the playoffs for the first time in three seasons.

It wasn't an auspicious start. Ricky Watters, signed as a free agent from the Super Bowl champion San Francisco, infamously came up short on a pass over the middle in the Eagles' season-opening 21–6 home loss to Tampa Bay. Following the contest, when asked why he didn't commit to catching the ball and taking a hit, he replied "For who? For what?"

Three weeks later, the Eagles were thumped by a 31-point margin against the Raiders in Oakland. However, the momentum swung in a positive direction after that, as Philly won four straight and seven of their next eight to get back in the playoff hunt.

On a frigid December 10 at the Vet against the Cowboys, the Eagles defense twice stopped Emmitt Smith on 4th-and-1 in Dallas territory late in the fourth quarter of a 17–17 tie. The change of possession resulted in the game-winning field goal from Gary Anderson. A win over Arizona the next week clinched a playoff berth, but a loss at Chicago in the season finale on Christmas Eve torpedoed any hopes of an NFC East crown. Thus, the Eagles were locked into the #4 seed in the NFC.

The 1995 season marked the final year that the Eagles donned their trademark Kelly green uniforms.

It was the final season with the Eagles for quarterback Randall Cunningham as he retired following the season before joining the Vikings for the 1997 season.

Offseason
The Eagles' training camp was held for 16th and final year at West Chester University of Pennsylvania's   John A. Farrell Stadium in West Chester, Pennsylvania. The camp was about 20 miles from their home stadium in south Philadelphia. In 1996 the Eagles would move to Lehigh University in Bethlehem, Pennsylvania about 50 miles away.

NFL draft
The  1995 NFL Draft was held April 22–23, 1995. The league also held a supplemental draft after the regular draft and before the regular season.

With a 7–9 record in 1994, and tying with four other teams, the Eagles would rotate picking between the 8th pick to the 12th pick in the seven rounds. They would choose eight players in the five rounds they had picks.
The Eagles would make a trade with the Tampa Bay Buccaneers, for draft picks to move from 12th to 7th on the 1st round. With their 1st pick in the draft, acquired from Tampa Bay, the Eagles chose Mike Mamula a defensive end out of Boston College.

The table shows the Eagles selections and what picks they had that were traded away and the team that ended up with that pick. It is possible the Eagles' pick ended up with this team via another team that the Eagles made a trade with. Not shown are acquired picks that the Eagles traded away.

Staff

Roster

Regular season

Schedule

Note: Intra-division opponents are in bold text.

Game summaries

Week 15

    
    
    
    
    
    
    
    

NFL Network selected this game as the #5 Moment at Home in Eagles' history.

The game is known in Philadelphia as the "Groundhog Day" game. When the Cowboys didn't make a first down on their second attempt at 4th and 1 from their own 29-yard line with less than 9 minutes left in the fourth quarter, Philadelphia radio announcer Merrill Reese exclaimed: "They give it to Smith and they stop him again! They stop him again! And this time they can't take it away from the Eagles!"

Standings

Playoffs

References

External links
 1995 Philadelphia Eagles at Pro-Football-Reference.com

Philadelphia Eagles seasons
Philadelphia Eagles
Philadelphia Eagles